Eugenio Mosso (10 August 1895 – 6 August 1961) was an Argentine-born Italian footballer who played as a forward. On 5 April 1914, he represented the Italy national football team on the occasion of a friendly match against Switzerland in a 1–1 away draw.

References

1895 births
1961 deaths
Italian footballers
Italy international footballers
Association football forwards
Torino F.C. players